Marie Stephan, (born 14 March 1996) is a professional squash player who represents France. She reached a career-high world ranking of World No. 53 in February 2022.

References

External links 

French female squash players
Penn Quakers women's squash players
Living people
1996 births